Located in the Quartiere San Lorenzo, the Policlinico Umberto I of Rome is the polyclinic of the Faculty of Medicine and Surgery of the Sapienza Università di Roma. The second largest public hospital in Italy (after the Policlinico Sant'Orsola-Malpighi in Bologna), its construction was mainly promoted by Italian physicians and politicians Guido Baccelli and Francesco Durante and began in 1883 to plans by Giulio Podesti and Filippo Laccetti, and was completed 20 years later, with the opening presided over by the then rector Luigi Galassi and by Umberto I of Italy, after whom it is named. It is served by the Policlinico Metro station.

External links 
Official site of the Policlinico

Hospital buildings completed in 1903
Hospitals in Rome
Hospitals established in 1903
1903 establishments in Italy
Rome Q. V Nomentano